Justice F. H. B. Koch, QC was a Ceylonese (Sri Lankan) judge and lawyer. He was a Judge of the Supreme Court of Ceylon and member of the Legislative Council of Ceylon.

During his legal career he had served as District Judge of Colombo and acting Solicitor General of Ceylon (1930 - 1931). From 1924 to 1931 he was a  member of the Legislative Council of Ceylon. In 1934 he was appointed a Puisne Justice of the Supreme Court of Ceylon.

References

Puisne Justices of the Supreme Court of Ceylon
Members of the Legislative Council of Ceylon
20th-century King's Counsel
20th-century Sri Lankan judges
British Ceylon judges